Un Susurro en la Tormenta (A Whisper in the Storm) is the eighth studio album by La Oreja de Van Gogh which was released on 18 September 2020 under Sony Music. The album, a follow-up to El Planeta Imaginario released four years prior, was produced by Paco Salazar, marking his first collaboration with the band. "Abrázame" served as the lead single in April 2020, followed by "Durante una Mirada" in September later that year. The band has also released a promotional single ("Te Pareces Tanto a Mí") in early July.

This album contains the first duet between lead vocalist Leire Martínez and the band's keyboardist, Xabi San Martín on the fourth track (and second single) of the album.

Production
The album title and its cover were first revealed by the band on 28 June 2020.

Track listing

Un Susurro en la Tormenta - iTunes edition

Charts

Weekly charts

Year-end charts

References

2020 albums
La Oreja de Van Gogh albums
Spanish-language albums